Mister Collins' Adventure (Swedish: Herr Collins äventyr) is a 1943 Swedish comedy film directed by and starring Anders Henrikson and also featuring Birgit Sergelius, Thor Modéen and Elof Ahrle. It was based on a novel by Frank Heller, which had previously been made into 1925 silent film The Adventure of Mr. Philip Collins. It was shot at the 
Centrumateljéerna Studios in Stockholm. The film's sets were designed by the art director Bertil Duroj.

Synopsis
Filip Collin, a small-town Swedish lawyer makes unwise speculations and loses his clients money on financial speculation. He heads abroad hoping to recoup his losses, heading first to Denmark and then to London. After revenging himself on a man who cheated him out of money, he establishes himself as a first-class confidence trickster. Despite the ineffectual pursuit of Inspector Kenyon of Scotland Yard, he is ultimately able to escape his career of crime thanks to the attractive Mary von Holten and an friend Russian Grand Duke.

Cast
 Anders Henrikson as 	Filip Collin
 Birgit Sergelius as 	Mary von Holten
 Thor Modéen as Grand Duke
 Elof Ahrle as 	Graham
 Stig Järrel as 	Grossmith
 Torsten Winge as 	Lavertisse
 Rune Carlsten as 	Kenyon
 Håkan Westergren as 	Vivitj
 Ragnar Widestedt as 	Sir John
 Carl-Gunnar Wingård as 	Walters
 Marianne Löfgren as Duchess

References

Bibliography 
 Krawc, Alfred. International Directory of Cinematographers, Set- and Costume Designers in Film: Denmark, Finland, Norway, Sweden (from the beginnings to 1984). Saur, 1986.

External links 
 

1943 films
Swedish comedy films
1943 comedy films
1940s Swedish-language films
Films directed by Anders Henrikson
Films based on Swedish novels
Films set in London
Films set in Denmark
1940s Swedish films